Zhang Shuguang (1920 – 20 November 2002), born Han Zhihong, also known as Han Jianxun, was a politician of the People's Republic of China. He was the Communist Party Chief of Inner Mongolia Autonomous Region from 1986 to 1987, and the Governor of Hebei Province from 1982 to 1986.

Zhang was born in Raoyang County, Hebei province. He joined the Chinese Communist Party in February 1938. He also served in Zhaotong prefecture and Wenshan Zhuang and Miao Autonomous Prefecture of Yunnan Province. Zhang died in November 2002 in Shijiazhuang, capital of Hebei.

References

1920 births
2002 deaths
Chinese Communist Party politicians from Hebei
People's Republic of China politicians from Hebei
Governors of Hebei
Political office-holders in Inner Mongolia
Political office-holders in Yunnan
Politicians from Hengshui
Members of the Central Advisory Commission